Matt Wallace is an American record producer. He is a graduate of the University of California at Berkeley, and has been producing professionally since the early 1980s. He is best known for his work with David Baerwald, Faith No More, Maroon 5, O.A.R., The Replacements, and Train.

Wallace has 
produced most of Faith No More's most iconic recordings, including We Care a Lot, their debut album on Mordam Records.  He produced and mixed their breakthrough album, The Real Thing, which featured the hit song, "Epic."  He produced Angel Dust, named the #1 most influential album of all time by Kerrang! despite an initially lukewarm review. In 2015, he joined the band again to co-mix their album, Sol Invictus. The album debuted at number 1 on the Billboard Hard Rock Album chart.

He produced albums for The Replacements (Don’t Tell A Soul), Paul Westerberg (14 Songs) and John Hiatt (Perfectly Good Guitar).  He co-produced the debut Juno-nominated album for Canadian singer-songwriter Chantal Kreviazuk. The album was certified double platinum in Canada.
 
Wallace produced and mixed Songs About Jane, the debut album for Maroon 5, including the Top 40 hit singles "Harder To Breathe," "This Love," "Sunday Morning," and "She Will Be Loved." The album has sold over 10 million copies worldwide, and won a Grammy Award for "Best New Artist" in 2005. 
 
Since then, Wallace has co-written songs and produced two albums for O.A.R.  He has also co-written and produced several songs for Andy Grammer, an album for Pepper, and mixed Blackberry Smoke's album The Whippoorwill.

Live at Studio Delux
In 2013, Wallace started a live music project with Will Kennedy (whose credits include Michael Franti, Thirsty Merc, Andy Grammer, and Pepper) called 'Live at Studio Delux'. The goal is to help music fans discover the joy of authentic live performances. With over 30 years of combined experience professionally recording and producing music, Wallace and Kennedy capture the artist at their best in a live studio environment. Each artist session is recorded in one day at Wallace's own studio, Studio Delux.  The mastered recordings are made available on iTunes while video content can be watched on the project's YouTube channel.

Credits
The Wild Flowers, Tales Like These
3 Doors Down, Us and the Night
R5, Sometime Last Night
New Beat Fund, Sponge Fingerz
Andy Grammer, "Co-Pilot"
Los Angelics, Land of the Brave and Dangerous
Tommy & The High Pilots, Only Human
Pepper, Pepper
Blackberry Smoke, The Whippoorwill
O.A.R., King 
Nat & Alex Wolff, Black Sheep
Andy Grammer, Andy Grammer
Necropolis of Love, The Hope
Ludo, Prepare the Preparations
Thirsty Merc, Mousetrap Heart
Eye Alaska, Genesis Underground
Trail, To The Rest Of The World
Eva Avila, Give Me the Music
O.A.R., All Sides
The 88, Not Only... But Also
The Dollyrots, "California Beach Boy"
Ludo, You're Awful, I Love You
Fightstar, One Day Son, This Will All Be Yours
Small Mercies, Beautiful Hum
The Higher, On Fire
Spin Doctors, Nice Talking to Me
As Fast As, Open Letter to the Damned
Josh Kelley, Almost Honest
Virginia Coalition, OK to Go
Kyle Riabko, Before I Speak
Maroon 5, Songs About Jane
Mushroomhead, XIII
Mushroomhead, A Wonderful Life
Squad Five-O, Late News Breaking
Automatic Black, De-Evolution
Wakefield, American Made
6Gig, Mind Over Mind
Sugarcult, Start Static
H2O, Go
Blues Traveler, Bridge
Buffalo Nickel, Long 33 Play
Dog's Eye View, Daisy
Train, "If You Leave"
Chantal Kreviazuk, Under These Rocks and Stones
Deftones, "Teething"
The Replacements, Don't Tell a Soul
Weapon of Choice, Highperspice, Nutmeg Phantasy
John Hiatt, Perfectly Good Guitar, "Hiatt Comes Alive at Budokan?"
Paul Westerberg, 14 Songs
Faith No More, Angel Dust
Faith No More, The Real Thing
Faith No More, Introduce Yourself
Faith No More, You Fat Bastards: Live at the Brixton Academy
Faith No More, We Care a Lot
Faith No More, Sol Invictus
The Spent Poets, The Spent Poets
Udora, Liberty Square
The Toll, "Sticks and Stones and Broken Bones"
Susanna Hoffs, Susanna Hoffs
Sons of Freedom, Sons of Freedom, Gump
New Monkees, What I Want single
Josh Clayton-Felt, Inarticulate Nature Boy
Imperial Teen, What Is Not to Love
Green Apple Quick Step, "Kid"
Chagall Guevara, Chagall Guevara
Bowling for Soup, Let's Do It for Johnny!
Fenix TX, Fenix TX
Peter Searcy, Could You Please and Thank You
Mars Electric - "Someday"
Everlast, "So Long"
R.E.M., "Revolution"
Bic Runga, Drive
Ednaswap, Ednaswap
Poe, Haunted
David Baerwald, Bedtime Stories
School of Fish, Human Cannonball
Zen From Mars, New Leaf
InCrest, The Ladder The Climb The Fall
Howlin' Maggie, Honeysuckle Strange
The Honeyrods, The Honeyrods
DDT, Urban Observer
Wagakki Band, "Hangeki no Yaiba"

References

Year of birth missing (living people)
American record producers
University of California, Berkeley alumni
Living people